Forgive Us Our Trespasses is the second studio album by the American post-metal band A Storm of Light. The song "Tempest" was made into a music video, directed by the guitarist/vocalist Josh Graham. The lyrics and album artwork depict environmental and post-apocalyptic themes, including references to the 'Sixth Extinction' alluded to in the Red Sparowes album At the Soundless Dawn, an album also featuring Graham.

Track listing

Personnel

A Storm of Light
Josh Graham – guitar, vocals, synthesizers, banjo, piano
Domenic Seita – bass guitar, backing vocals, percussion
Andy Rice – drums, percussion
Joel Hamilton – guitar, modular synthesizer, wurlitzer, percussion

Session musicians
Nerissa Campbell – guest vocals on tracks 2, 6, and 7
Jarboe – guest vocals on tracks 4 and 8
Lydia Lunch – spoken word on tracks 1, 6, and 9
Carla Kihlstedt – guest vocals and violin on tracks 1 and 6
Marika Hughes – cello on tracks 1, 4, and 10
Aaron Lazar – backing vocals on track 7
Marc Allen Goodman – backing vocals on track 7

References

2009 albums
A Storm of Light albums